Najand Institute of Higher Education is a public university located in Urmia, West Azerbaijan, Iran. Najand offers bachelor's degree and associate degrees in engineering and basic sciences. In 2010 Najand started operations with approximately 200 students; in 2012 enrolment had reached 600 students.

Universities in Iran
2010 establishments in Iran
Education in Urmia
Buildings and structures in Urmia